Walter Smith Gedney (October 31, 1880 – August 17, 1953) was an American lawyer and politician from New York.

Life 
Gedney was born on October 31, 1880 in Peoria, Illinois. He moved to Nyack, New York with his father when he was 2.

Gedney graduated from Nyack High School in 1895 and the New York University School of Law in 1911. He practiced law in New York City for many years at 38 Park Row. He joined the Mazeppa Engine Company of Nyack in 1905, later serving as fire commissioner of Mazeppa for three years and as the company's delegate to the Hudson Valley Volunteer Firemen's Association for 15 years. He served as president of the New York State Volunteer Firemen's Association for two years, also serving as its attorney and chairman of the law committee. He moved to Hudson in 1938.

Gedney served as police justice of Nyack from 1916 to 1919. In 1923, he was elected to the New York State Assembly as a Republican, representing Rockland County. He served in the Assembly in 1924, 1925, 1926, 1927, 1928, and 1929. When he initially ran in 1923, he defeated incumbent James Farley. While in the Assembly, he was a member of the Baumes Crime Commission.

Gedney was a member of the Rockland County Republican county committee and president of the Nyack Republican club. He was a member of the Knights of Pythias, the Order of United American Mechanics, the Elks, the Shriners, the Tall Cedars, and Master of his Freemason lodge. He was a member of the Nyack Reformed Church.

Gedney died at the New York State Firemen's Home in Hudson on August 17, 1953. He was buried in Oak Hill Cemetery.

References

External links 

 The Political Graveyard

1880 births
1953 deaths
Politicians from Peoria, Illinois
People from Nyack, New York
Nyack High School alumni
New York University School of Law alumni
20th-century American lawyers
Lawyers from New York City
American fire chiefs
People from Hudson, New York
20th-century American politicians
Politicians from Rockland County, New York
Republican Party members of the New York State Assembly
American Freemasons
Reformed Church in America members
Burials in New York (state)